Theodore Cohen is an American exhibition designer. He was named the American Craft Council's Honorary Fellow in 2000.

References

Year of birth missing (living people)
Living people
American designers
Exhibition designers
Place of birth missing (living people)